Greenwood is a city in Jackson and Cass counties in the U.S. state of Missouri. The population was 5,221 at the 2010 census. It is part of the Kansas City metropolitan area.

History 
Greenwood was laid out in 1867.  A post office called Greenwood has been in operation since 1866. The city was incorporated in 1963.

Geography 
Greenwood is located at  (38.850808, -94.346256). The town has a small creek running through it in the southwest. The area that constitutes Greenwood is mainly lightly wooded and open fields northeast of its rail line, along with several small ponds. The area southwest of the rail line is mostly suburban, featuring housing along with a small downtown area.

Demographics

2010 census 
As of the census of 2010, there were 5,221 people, 1,769 households, and 1,412 families living in the city. The racial makeup of the city was 91.7% White, 5.1% African American, 0.3% Native American, 0.5% Asian, 0.7% from other races, and 1.7% from two or more races. Hispanic or Latino of any race were 3.4% of the population.

There were 1,769 households, of which 51.0% had children under the age of 18 living with them, 66.2% were married couples living together, 8.9% had a female householder with no husband present, 4.7% had a male householder with no wife present, and 20.2% were non-families. 15.1% of all households were made up of individuals, and 2.6% had someone living alone who was 65 years of age or older. The average household size was 2.95 and the average family size was 3.30.

The median age in the city was 32.2 years. 32.6% of residents were under the age of 18; 6.7% were between the ages of 18 and 24; 34% were from 25 to 44; 20.6% were from 45 to 64; and 6.2% were 65 years of age or older. The gender makeup of the city was 49.9% male and 50.1% female.

2000 census 
As of the census of 2000, there were 3,952 people, 1,352 households, and 1,122 families living in the city. The population density was 978.3 people per square mile (377.7/km2). There were 1,407 housing units at an average density of 348.3 per square mile (134.5/km2). The racial makeup of the city was 95.07% White, 2.25% African American, 0.30% Native American, 0.46% Asian, 0.05% Pacific Islander, 0.56% from other races, and 1.32% from two or more races. Hispanic or Latino of any race were 2.10% of the population.

There were 1,352 households, out of which 49.8% had children under the age of 18 living with them, 71.6% were married couples living together, 7.8% had a female householder with no husband present, and 17.0% were non-families. 13.2% of all households were made up of individuals, and 2.1% had someone living alone who was 65 years of age or older. The average household size was 2.92 and the average family size was 3.21.

In the city the population was spread out, with 32.6% under the age of 18, 6.0% from 18 to 24, 43.5% from 25 to 44, 12.9% from 45 to 64, and 4.9% who were 65 years of age or older. The median age was 30 years. For every 100 females, there were 101.0 males. For every 100 females age 18 and over, there were 98.8 males.

The median income for a household in the city was $62,574, and the median income for a family was $65,313. Males had a median income of $42,173 versus $28,750 for females. The per capita income for the city was $21,586. About 2.9% of families and 3.9% of the population were below the poverty line, including 5.7% of those under age 18 and 9.4% of those age 65 or over.

Education 

Greenwood is served by the Lee's Summit R-VII School District.  This includes Greenwood Elementary School located inside Greenwood and both Summit Lakes Middle School and Lee's Summit West High School located in southern Lee's Summit.

Transportation

Major road 
  Route 150 – A highway linking Greenwood to Southern Lee's Summit, Grandview, and to Overland Park at State Line Road.

Wildlife

Fauna 
Greenwood has a very typical amount of biodiversity for the region it is in. There are many species of snake that can be found in Greenwood.  In the creek you can also find the common snapping turtle. The creek also contains many toad and frog species including the bullfrog. Large population of white-tailed deer find portions of their range running through Greenwood. Many of Missouri's common spider species can be found in Greenwood such as the wolf spider, cellar spider, and brown recluse. Greenwood also contains a healthy opossum population. Small mammals such as the eastern cottontail, raccoon, and some mice species can be found be in large numbers. Greenwood's creek contains several species of fish including bluegills. Many species of birds such as the Canada goose and cardinal live in or migrate through Greenwood on a season to season basis. Many of Greenwood's households are home to domestic animals such as dogs and cats which are a common sight in the yards of Greenwood.

See also 
 Kansas City Universities – List of Kansas City Area Colleges and Universities
 Lee's Summit schools – List of close private schools and colleges
 Lee's Summit Roads – List of close major roads

References

External links 
 City of Greenwood 

Cities in Jackson County, Missouri
Cities in Cass County, Missouri
Populated places established in 1867
Cities in Missouri